Ryan Shore (born 29 December 1974) is a Canadian composer, songwriter, conductor, music producer, and music director for film, television, virtual reality, records, games, concerts, and theater.  He is often known from his scores for Star Wars, Scooby-Doo!, Elmo, and Go! Go! Cory Carson. He is a Yamaha Artist and a graduate of the Berklee College of Music.

Music career

Shore was Assistant Music Director and Contributing Composer/Arranger/Orchestrator for the 87th Academy Awards, where he worked with artists Lady Gaga, John Legend, Adam Levine, Anna Kendrick, Common, Tim McGraw, Jack Black, Neil Patrick Harris, and Jennifer Hudson.

Shore’s 100+ composing credits include the Lin-Manuel Miranda movie musical In the Heights (additional music), Mark Steven Johnson's romantic comedy features Love In The Villa (Netflix) and Love, Guaranteed (Netflix),The Not-Too-Late Show with Elmo (HBO Max), Star Wars Galaxy of Adventures (Lucasfilm),, Star Wars Forces of Destiny (Lucasfilm), score and songs for Go! Go! Cory Carson (Netflix)., Julie's Greenroom (Netflix) starring Julie Andrews with all new puppets from the Jim Henson Company, score and songs for Penn Zero: Part-Time Hero (Disney), Scooby-Doo! WrestleMania Mystery (Warner Bros), Scooby-Doo! and WWE: Curse of the Speed Demon (Warner Bros), Monsterville: Cabinet of Souls (Universal)(Emmy Award nomination, Outstanding Music Direction and Composition), Spy Hunter (Warner Bros), The Shrine (Grammy Award nomination, Best Score) Prime (Universal) starring Meryl Streep, Cop and a Half: New Recruit (Universal), Harvard Man (Lionsgate), and The Girl Next Door (Anchor Bay). He also composed on-camera music for Fur, starring Nicole Kidman and Robert Downey, Jr., and was seen in the film performing his original music.

Shore has conducted orchestras around the world in recordings and concerts including The New York Philharmonic, The Hollywood Symphony Orchestra, The Skywalker Symphony Orchestra, The Czech Philharmonic, as well as conducting concerts for Pokémon: Symphonic Evolutions and Soundtracks Live! featuring music from Star Wars: The Force Awakens.

Shore's Broadway and theater credits include orchestrations and arrangements for Broadway concerts starring Tony Award winners Sutton Foster, Idina Menzel, Whoopi Goldberg, Matthew Broderick, Kristin Chenoweth, Heather Headley, and Faith Prince, as well as music directing the Los Angeles production of Heathers: The Musical, directed by Andy Fickman.

Shore plays saxophone and has performed with artists including John Williams, Matchbox Twenty, Barry Manilow, Johnny Mathis, Natalie Cole, Dave Koz, Arturo Sandoval, Gerry Mulligan, Ana Gasteyer, Mark Ballas, and Clark Terry.

Personal life
Shore is the nephew of film composer Howard Shore.

Shore is a certified private pilot.

Awards

Emmy Awards

Grammy Awards

Other Awards

Major Studio Credits

Discography

References

External links

  
 
 
 
 
 [ Ryan Shore at Allmusic.com]

1974 births
Berklee College of Music alumni
Male conductors (music)
Canadian film score composers
Canadian jazz saxophonists
Male saxophonists
Canadian record producers
Canadian songwriters
Canadian television composers
Jewish Canadian musicians
Living people
Male film score composers
Male television composers
Musicians from Toronto
Video game composers
21st-century saxophonists
21st-century Canadian conductors (music)
21st-century Canadian male musicians
Canadian male jazz musicians
The Delphian Jazz Orchestra members
Songwriters from Florida
Varèse Sarabande Records artists
21st-century Canadian composers
20th-century Canadian male musicians
20th-century Canadian composers
La-La Land Records artists